The 2005 Florida Atlantic University Owls football team represented Florida Atlantic University in the 2005 NCAA Division I-A football season. The team was coached by Howard Schnellenberger and played their home games at Lockhart Stadium in Fort Lauderdale, Florida.

Schedule

Roster

Awards and honors

All-Sun Belt honors
 First Team All-Sun Belt Conference:
 Shomari Earls (LB, Sr.)
 Willie Hughley (CB, Sr.)
 Honorable Mention All-Sun Belt Conference:
 Danny Embick (QB, Sr.)
 Jarrid Smith (OL, So.)

References

Florida Atlantic
Florida Atlantic Owls football seasons
Florida Atlantic Owls football